The 1990 Calgary Stampeders finished in 1st place in the West Division with an 11–6–1 record. They were defeated in the West Final by the Edmonton Eskimos.

Offseason

CFL Draft

Preseason

Regular season

Season Standings

Season schedule

Awards and records

1990 CFL All-Stars

Western All-Star Selections

Playoffs

West Final

References

Calgary Stampeders seasons
Calg
Calgary Stampeders